Barbara Watson may refer to:

 Barbara M. Watson (1918–1983), United States diplomat
 Barbara Watson (politician) (born 1950), member of the Florida House of Representatives
 Barbara Watson, fictional character in the TV series Black Summer